A Face to Die For (also known as The Face in the UK & Australia) is a 1996 television film, based on the book The Face by Marvin and Mark Werlin. The teleplay was also written by Marvin Werlin, Mark Werlin and Duane Poole, is a romantic thriller that starred Yasmine Bleeth, James Wilder and Robin Givens.

Plot
Due to a tragic childhood accident, Emily Gilmore (Yasmine Bleeth) is left scarred both physically and mentally. The large scar on her face is a constant reminder to Emily that her career and love life are suffering. Lonely yet talented, Emily longs for a successful career and romance but is trapped by insecurity and fear.

The handsome Alec Dalton (James Wilder) turns Emily's life around and makes her feel truly happy and secure for the first time in her life.  Unfortunately, Alec talks Emily into stealing money from her employer. But the old man that Emily works for comes in during the heist and has a heart attack. Emily stays behind to help him while Alec runs off. He gets away with the money but Emily is sent to prison. She is so in love with Alec she does not say a word about Alec's involvement.

While Emily is in prison she learns that Alec has run away with her own sister, Sheila Gilmore (Chandra West). Devastated, Emily gets in a fight with another inmate and because of the injuries she sustains she has to be seen by Dr. Matthew Sheridan (Richard Beymer). The doctor tells her that he can correct her scars for free with an experimental surgery. It's a great success and Emily is beautiful, almost unrecognizable. After the surgery Emily begins a relationship with the surgeon, who showers her in gifts and love. She is released from prison and the two get engaged, but Emily leaves him when she discovers that Matthew had reconstructed her face to be identical to his dead wife's.

Emily attempts to begin again, changing her name to Adrian Corday and starting her own business as a fashion designer with her friend from prison Claudia (Robin Givens). She reconnects with a kind man from her past, Paul (Ricky Paull Goldin), and starts a relationship with him (though he does not know her true identity.) But when Emily runs into Alec and he does not recognize her, she decides to take her revenge.

During the Climax of the film, Alec recognizes Adrian as Emily under the make up and plastic surgery because of the scar. Giving him the money, she tries to kill him. Alec is able to take the gun away, only to find out it's a fake and tries to scar Emily again. However, Sheila appears and confronts him. She tells Alec that she knew he set Emily up because Claudia told her everything. During their struggle, she shoots him in the chest and he collapses to the ground dead. Taking Sheila to her room, they clean up the blood on their faces. She confessed she killed him after finding out how he set Emily up because he was infatuated with her. After their marriage, Alec was very abusive to Sheila, gave her a similar scar and it drove her to drink. Emily convinces her to go home and let her deal with this. If the cops call and tells Sheila about Alec's death, she must act surprised and inconsolable. She asks Emily to forgive her for what happened. She assures Sheila she has and tells her to go home.

Changing her clothes and putting on make up, Emily goes downstairs and pretends to be shocked when she asks the concierge what happened. He informs her about a shooting and there was a woman with a scar who wanted to meet up with Alec, but then another woman showed up and shot him. Paul appears and apologizes to Emily. While escaping, she decides to come clean to him about her past. Paul tells Emily that he already knew because Sheila and Claudia told him about it. He reassures her that her secret is safe with him.

Cast

 Yasmine Bleeth as Emily Gilmore
 Kashia Miller  as Young Emily Gilmore
 James Wilder as Alec Dalton
 Richard Beymer as Dr. Matthew Sheridan
 Ricky Paull Goldin as Paul Mallory
 Robin Givens as Claudia
 Chandra West as Sheila Gilmore
 Mitch Ryan as Joe Thomas	
 Rosalind Ayres as Mrs. Travers
 Bette Ford as Mrs. Berman
 Kelly Jo Minter as Rita
 Michael Clark as Michael
 Pat Musick as Mrs. Anderson
 Ian Abercrombie as Mr. Sturetsky
 Philip Simon as Hotel clerk
 Toni Sawyer as Woman at reception
 Scott McKinley as Anesthesiologist
 Elisabeth Ryall as Linda Blake
 Francesca Poston
 Mary Ellen Trainor as Mrs. Gilmore	
 Jo De Winter as Bunny Thomas

Production

Ricky Paull Goldin, who acted in this film along with Yasmine Bleeth, was engaged to be married to Yasmine, but the wedding was called off after the wedding invitations had already been printed.

References

External links
 

1996 television films
1996 films
1990s romantic thriller films
Lifetime (TV network) films
American romantic thriller films
1996 romantic drama films
Films scored by Christopher Franke
1990s English-language films
1990s American films